Kalateh-ye Mir (also Romanized as Kalāteh-ye Mīr; also known as Qā’emābād) is a village in Shusef Rural District, Shusef District, Nehbandan County, South Khorasan Province, Iran. At the 2006 census, its population was 78, in 22 families.

References 

Populated places in Nehbandan County